The 2017 TCR Thailand Touring Car Championship will be the second season of the TCR Thailand Touring Car Championship. The championship will run within the Thailand Super Series' events.

Teams and drivers

Calendar and results
The 2017 schedule was announced in January 2017.

Drivers' championship

Notes:
† – Drivers did not finish the race, but were classified as they completed over 75% of the race distance.
‡ – Pasarit Promsombat did not score any points at the fourth round of the championship, as he was the only Pro-Am entry.

References

External links
 

Thailand Touring Car Championship
TCR